Saint-Bauzile is a commune in the Ardèche department in southern France.

Population

See also
Communes of the Ardèche department

Kathleen Cavendish (Kennedy) Death

Kathleen Cavendish, Marchioness of Hartington (née Kennedy; February 20, 1920 – May 13, 1948), also known as "Kick" Kennedy, was an American socialite and sister to John Fitzgerald Kennedy. She died in a plane crash in 1948, flying to the south of France while on vacation with her new partner, the 8th Earl Fitzwilliam.

References

Communes of Ardèche
Ardèche communes articles needing translation from French Wikipedia